Domodedovskaya is a Moscow Metro station in Orekhovo-Borisovo Severnoye and Orekhovo-Borisovo Yuzhnoye districts, Southern Administrative Okrug, Moscow. It is on the Zamoskvoretskaya Line, between Orekhovo and Krasnogvardeyskaya stations.

The station opened on 7 September 1985.

Name

On March 29, 2020 due to the coronavirus pandemic in Russia, the management of the Moscow Metro temporarily renamed the station to "DomaDedovskaya" (rus. ДомаДедовская) which refer to "Grandfather at home" to remind the citizen of Moscow to stay their elderly parents at home.

Location
It located at the intersection of Kashirskoye Highway and Orekhovy Boulevard. There are also exits to General Belov street.

Connection
There is a regular shuttle bus service from the station to Domodedovo, as Domodedovskaya provides the fastest ground access to the airport.

Building
The station was designed by architects Nina A. Aleshina and N. Samoylova. Like many other stations built in the 1970s and 1980s, Domodedovskaya has a decorative theme related to the local surroundings. Appropriately enough, the theme here is aviation. The pillars are faced with white marble with inlays of darker marble, and the walls are decorated with plaques depicting Soviet aircraft.

References

Moscow Metro stations
Railway stations in Russia opened in 1985
Airport railway stations in Russia
Zamoskvoretskaya Line
Railway stations located underground in Russia